Teo Susnjak (born 23 July 1977) is a New Zealand academic and former professional tennis player. He is a senior lecturer in computer science at Massey University.

Susnjak, a Croatian-born player, was an Australian Open junior quarter-finalist. Ranked as high as 362 in the world, he had a win over Lleyton Hewitt at the 1997 Perth Challenger and made an ATP Tour main draw appearance at the 1998 Heineken Open in Auckland. He represented the New Zealand Davis Cup team in a 1998 tie against Japan in Miyazaki, where he featured in two singles rubbers.

See also
List of New Zealand Davis Cup team representatives

References

External links
 
 
 

1977 births
Living people
New Zealand male tennis players
Academic staff of the Massey University
New Zealand computer scientists
Croatian emigrants to New Zealand
Tennis players from Split, Croatia